Lepenica is a small river in central Bosnia and Herzegovina. The Lepenica is right and main tributary of the Fojnička River. Its source is under the mountain of Ivan and runs through Kiseljak before its confluence with the Fojnička River.

Rivers of Bosnia and Herzegovina